"Merci, Chérie" ("Thank you, darling") was the winning song in the Eurovision Song Contest 1966, performed for  by Udo Jürgens with lyrics in German and partially in French. It is an earnest ballad in which the singer, as he leaves her, thanks his lover for good times and positive memories.

The song was performed ninth on the night, following 's Madalena Iglésias with "Ele e ela" and preceding 's Lill Lindfors and Svante Thuresson with "Nygammal vals". The final points tally for "Mercie, Chérie" was 31, securing it first place at the head of an 18-entry field.

This was also the only time that Austria would win the Eurovision Song Contest until  when Conchita Wurst won with the song "Rise Like a Phoenix".

Udo has recorded the song also in French, Japanese ( "Merushī sherī"), English, Italian (adapted by Vito Pallavicini) and Spanish (adapted by Arturo Kaps-Schönfeld).

Chart performance

Cover versions 
 The song was covered by English singer Vince Hill. Baker Cavendish wrote the English lyrics, with musical arrangement by Johnny Arthey. Released on EMI Columbia, Hill reached number 36 on the UK Singles Chart with it in June 1966.
 English singer Matt Monro (who had competed against Jürgens in the 1964 Eurovision Song Contest and who had a major hit with the English version of "Warum nur, warum?") included his recording of the English version on his 1966 album This Is the Life, releasing the track as a single that failed to chart.
 Gunnar Wiklund with Nisse Hansén's orchestra recorded it for the Swedish market in 1966. Al Sundström wrote the Swedish lyrics but kept the French title. The song was released on the EP Sjunger Eurovisionsschlager 1966 on His Master's Voice.
 In 1967, Bent Fabric released an instrumental version of the song on his album Operation Lovebirds.
 In 2007, American pop star Belinda Carlisle recorded a French version of the song and included it on her album of standards, Voila.
 Violinist Lidia Baich, winner of the Eurovision Young Musicians 1998, performed an excerpt of the song live on stage during the opening act of the Eurovision Song Contest 2015 held in Vienna.

References 

1966 songs
1966 singles
Songs about parting
Eurovision songs of Austria
Eurovision songs of 1966
Songs written by Udo Jürgens
Eurovision Song Contest winning songs
Disques Vogue singles
1966 in Austria
Matt Monro songs